KLA may refer to:

Military 
Korean Liberation Army, created in 1940
Kosovo Liberation Army, Kosovo-Albanian insurgent organization

Organizations 
 Kansas Library Association
 Kentucky Library Association
 Kerala Library Association
 KLA Corporation, semiconductor equipment company

Other 
 Kampala Airport,  Uganda - IATA code
 Klamath-Modoc language, ISO 639-3 code kla